Raskolnikow is a 1923 German silent drama film directed by Robert Wiene. The film is an adaptation of the 1866 novel Crime and Punishment by Fyodor Dostoyevsky.

The film is characterised by Jason Buchanan of AllMovie as a German expressionist view of the story: a "nightmarish" avant-garde or experimental psychological drama. It premiered at the Mozartsaal in Berlin.

Cast
 Gregori Chmara as Rodion Raskolnikow
 Elisabeta Skulskaja as Mother of Rodion Raskolnikow
 Alla Tarasova as Sister of Rodion Raskolnikow
 Andrei Zhilinsky as Rasumichin
 Mikhail Tarkhanov as Marmeladow
 Mariya Germanova as Wife of Marmeladow
 Maria Kryshanovskaya as Sonja, daughter of Marmeladow
 Toma as Alona Iwanowa,  (the usurer)
 Petr Sharov as Swidrigailow

Reception
In a retrospective review by Tim Pulleine in the Monthly Film Bulletin that the film was "a conventional prestige opus of the day." Pulleine opined that the dramatisation of the novel was "tolerably effective, barring a few lapses into excessive histrionics (Marmeladov's expiatory confession of alcoholism might have looked extreme in a temperance melodrama)." Pulleine also found that the "most basic problem [...] is that the set designs create a rebarbative dichotomy within the film, since-apart perhaps from the sequences taking place on the stairway leading up to a pawnbroker's flat-the performers are not spatially integrated into the settings but remain obstinately on a separate plane of stylisation."

References

Bibliography
 Jung, Uli & Schatzberg, Walter. Beyond Caligari: The Films of Robert Wiene. Berghahn Books, 1999.

External links
 
 

Films of the Weimar Republic
1923 films
1923 drama films
German black-and-white films
German silent feature films
Films directed by Robert Wiene
German Expressionist films
Films based on Crime and Punishment
German drama films
Silent drama films
1920s German films